Flat five, the lowered fifth scale degree or chord factor fifth, may refer to:

 Tritone
 Locrian mode
 Dominant seventh flat five chord
 Altered chord